Love & Death is an upcoming American crime drama streaming television miniseries directed by Lesli Linka Glatter and written by David E. Kelley. It is set to premiere on April 27, 2023, on HBO Max.

Premise
The series is based on the true story of Wylie, Texas, housewife Candy Montgomery, who was accused of the brutal axe murder of her friend Betty Gore in 1980.

Cast and characters

Episodes

Production
It was announced in May 2021 that HBO Max had greenlit the miniseries, with Elizabeth Olsen set to star. Jesse Plemons would join the cast later in the month. In June, Patrick Fugit was added to the cast, with Lily Rabe, Keir Gilchrist, Elizabeth Marvel, Tom Pelphrey and Krysten Ritter joining in the following months.

Filming was primarily done on a sound stage in Kyle, Texas, and began  on September 27, 2021. Filming concluded on April 7, 2022. On location shooting was done in Austin, Texas and surrounding areas to include La Grange, Texas, Coupland, Texas, Georgetown, Texas, Hutto, Texas, Seguin, Texas, Kerrville, Texas, Lockhart, Texas, Killeen, Texas, Smithville, Texas, Buda, TX and San Marcos, Texas.

Release
Love & Death is scheduled to premiere on April 27, 2023,  with the first three episodes available immediately and the rest debuting on a weekly basis until May 25.

See also
 Candy (2022), another television miniseries based on the same case.

References

External links
 

Upcoming drama television series
American biographical series
American crime drama television series
HBO Max original programming
Television series by Lionsgate Television
Television series created by David E. Kelley
Television series set in 1980
Television shows about murder
Television shows based on books
Television shows filmed in Texas
Television shows set in Texas